Modulin may refer to:
 Modulen, The brand of dietary supplement by Nestlé designed for persons with Crohn's disease
 Phenol-soluble modulin, a family of protein toxins
 Toll-like receptor and TLR 2, proteins of which some were previously classified as "modulins"
 A musical instrument that is a monophonic analogue homebuilt theremin/violin-esque synthesizer, invented by the band Wintergatan

Proteins